Carlo Crialese (born 14 November 1992) is an Italian professional footballer who plays as a left back for  club Crotone on loan from Pro Vercelli.

Club career
Crialese started his senior career at Italian Serie D club Gaeta. In 2011 Crialese joined Lega Pro Seconda Divisione club Aprilia. In 2012, he joined fellow fourth-tier club Lamezia. In 2013, he moved to the third tier club Nocerina, via Parma. Nocerina also signed Tozzi and Rosato from Parma. During the season, Nocerina was suspected to match-fixing after 8 players were injured, leaving not enough players for the rest of the match. Thus the club was expelled from the league and relegated. On 1 August 2014, the club was assigned to Eccellenza Campania, two tier below Lega Pro, as Lega Pro only had one unified division since 2014–15 season. However, Crialese himself did not find any club for the second half of 2013–14 season.

Cesena
On 30 June 2014, the last day of 2013–14 financial year, Crialese, Emmanuel Cascione, Mohamed Traoré were sold from Parma to Serie A newcomers Cesena, with Nicola Ravaglia, Gianluca Turchetta and Nicolò Lolli moved to opposite direction. Crialese signed an initial three-year contract.

On 1 September 2014, he was signed by Cremonese. The loan deal was extended on 8 July 2015. He returned to Cesena for their pre-season camp on 14 July 2016.

However, on 25 July 2016, Crialese was signed by Bassano in another loan.

On 12 July 2017, he received a call-up from Cesena for their 2017 pre-season camp. However, he left the club less than a month of the new season.

Pro Vercelli
On 20 July 2017, Crialese joined Pro Vercelli, with Ernesto Starita moved to opposite direction. Crialese was immediately left for Serie C club Juve Stabia.

Loan to Virtus Entella
On 6 August 2018, he joined Serie C side Virtus Entella on a two-year loan deal. Virtus Entella was promoted to Serie B for the second season of his loan.

Loan to Perugia
On 6 August 2020, Crialese went to Perugia on loan.

Loan to Crotone
On 31 August 2022, Crialese joined Crotone on loan with a conditional obligation to buy.

References

External links
 AIC profile (data by football.it) 
 

1992 births
Living people
Footballers from Rome
Italian footballers
Association football defenders
Serie B players
Serie C players
Serie D players
Atletico Roma F.C. players
Vigor Lamezia players
Parma Calcio 1913 players
A.S.G. Nocerina players
A.C. Cesena players
U.S. Cremonese players
Bassano Virtus 55 S.T. players
F.C. Pro Vercelli 1892 players
S.S. Juve Stabia players
Virtus Entella players
A.C. Perugia Calcio players
F.C. Crotone players